The 2016 Football West season was the third season under the new competition format in Western Australia. The overall premier for the new structure – Perth – qualified for the National Premier Leagues finals series, competing with the other Federation champions in a final knockout tournament to decide the National Premier Leagues Champion for 2016.

Pre-season changes

League tables

2016 National Premier Leagues WA

The 2016 National Premier Leagues WA season was played over 22 rounds commencing 19 March 2016, followed by the return of a Top 4 Finals series. Despite the flagged return of a promotion/relegation system for the bottom team, it was determined after the season ended that no State League Division One club met all the criteria for promotion, and that the teams in the 2017 season would remain unchanged. This decision was changed 3 weeks later, with Football West stating that both Joondalup United and Mandurah City would be promoted, and their overall promotion criteria would be reviewed.

Finals

2016 WA State League Division 1

The 2016 WA State League Division 1 Season was the second tier domestic football competition in Western Australia. It was decided after the season ended that  no club met all the criteria for promotion to the NPL for the following season, but that decision was reversed three weeks later.

Promotion/relegation play-off

Dianella wins 4–2 on aggregate, and stays in Division 1 in 2017.

2016 WA State League Division 2

The 2016 WA State League Division 2 Season was the third tier domestic football competition in Western Australia. The top team at the end of the year is promoted to the 2017 WA State League Division 1, with the second team qualifying to a promotion/relegation playoff.

2016 Women's State League Premier Division

The highest tier domestic football competition in Western Australia is known as the BankWest Women's State League Premier Division for sponsorship reasons.  The 8 teams play each other three times, for a total of 21 rounds, and with a promotion/relegation system for the bottom team with the State League Division 1.

2016 Cool Ridge Cup

Western Australian soccer clubs competed in 2016 for the Football West State Cup, known that year as the Cool Ridge Cup for sponsorship reasons. Clubs entered from the National Premier Leagues WA, the two divisions of the State League, a limited number of teams from various divisions of the 2016 Sunday League competition, and from regional teams invited from the South West, Goldfields, Great Southern and Midwest regions.

This knockout competition was won by Floreat Athena, their 6th title.

The competition also served as the Western Australian Preliminary rounds for the 2016 FFA Cup. In addition to the A-League club Perth Glory, the two finalists – Cockburn City and Floreat Athena – qualified for the final rounds of the 2016 FFA Cup, entering at the Round of 32.

References

Football West
2016